Mauro Caballero may refer to:

 Mauro Caballero (footballer, born 1972), Paraguayan international football striker
 Mauro Caballero (footballer, born 1994), Paraguayan football striker for Arouca
 Mauro Caballero (Honduran footballer), Honduran football attacking midfielder